Heard may refer to:

Hearing (sense)
Heard (surname)
The Heard, an American 1960s garage rock band
Heard Island and McDonald Islands, an Australian external territory
Heard County, Georgia, U.S.

See also
Herd
Hird
Hurd (disambiguation)